City of Dunedin, during the first two parliaments called Town of Dunedin, was a parliamentary electorate in Dunedin in Otago, New Zealand. It was one of the original electorates created in 1853 and existed, with two breaks, until 1905. The first break, from 1862 to 1866, was caused by an influx of people through the Otago Gold Rush, when many new electorates were formed in Otago. The second break occurred from 1881 to 1890. It was the only New Zealand electorate that was created as a single-member, two-member and three member electorate.

Population centres
In December 1887, the House of Representatives voted to reduce its membership from general electorates from 91 to 70. The 1890 electoral redistribution used the same 1886 census data used for the 1887 electoral redistribution. In addition, three-member electorates were introduced in the four main centres. This resulted in a major restructuring of electorates, and Dunedin was one of eight electorates to be re-created for the 1890 election.

History
From 1853 to 1860, the electorate was known as the Town of Dunedin. From 1860 to 1905, it was the City of Dunedin.

James Macandrew was the first elected member. He resigned on 2 November 1858 and was re-elected in a 14 January 1859 by-election.

Elections for the first two-member electorate were held on 24 December 1860. Three people contested the poll, with Thomas Dick and Edward McGlashan returned.

In 1863, the electorate was abolished and replaced with Dunedin and Suburbs North and Dunedin and Suburbs South. It was recreated for the 1866 general election.

James Gordon Stuart Grant was a local eccentric and a frequent candidate from 1867 to 1884.

The 1875 election was contested by eight candidates. The three candidates on the anti-centralist ticket, James Macandrew, William Larnach and Robert Stout, were all successful. They beat William Reynolds, James Macassey Henry Fish, James Grant and John Armstrong.

Larnach resigned on 31 May 1878.

The 1893 election was contested by eight candidates, who contested three available positions. William Hutchison and David Pinkerton were incumbents who were successful, William Earnshaw was the third successful candidate (he had represented the Peninsula electorate in the previous Parliament), the previous representative Henry Fish came fourth, Hugh Gourley was fifth, with other unsuccessful candidates being James Gore, Charles Haynes, and David Nicol.

Dunedin was recreated for the 2020 general election as a single-member electorate, as Dunedin no longer has a population large enough to support two electorates. The electorate, however, does not include South Dunedin, as that is now part of a recreated  electorate.

Members of Parliament
The multi-member electorate was represented by 23 Members of Parliament:

Single-member electorate
From 1853 to 1860, Town of Dunedin was a single-member electorate.

Two-member electorate
From 1860 to 1863, and 1866 to 1875 City of Dunedin was a two-member electorate. Under the Representation Act 1862 the City of Dunedin electorate was abolished, with two new electorates, Dunedin and Suburbs North and Dunedin and Suburbs South replacing it, with elections being held on 28 March to 6 April 1863 respectively.

Three-member electorate
From 1875 to 1881, and 1890 to 1905 City of Dunedin was a three-member electorate.

Key:

Election results

1899 election

1897 by-election

1896 election

 
 
 
 
 
 
 
 
 
 
 
 
 
 
 
 

Table footnotes:

1893 election

1890 election

1875 election

1879 City of Dunedin by-election

1878 City of Dunedin by-election

1874 City of Dunedin by-election

1869 City of Dunedin by-election

1867 City of Dunedin by-election

May 1862 City of Dunedin by-election

1860 election

1859 by-election

Notes

References

Historical electorates of New Zealand
Politics of Dunedin
1853 establishments in New Zealand
1905 disestablishments in New Zealand
1890 establishments in New Zealand
1881 disestablishments in New Zealand